Richard Burroughs Mather (November 11, 1913 – November 28, 2014) was an American Sinologist who was a professor of Chinese at the University of Minnesota for 35 years.

Life and career
Richard Burroughs Mather was born on November 11, 1913, in Baoding, China, where his American parents were serving as Protestant missionaries.  He lived in China for his entire youth before going to the United States in the early 1930s to attend Princeton University, where he graduated with a B.A. summa cum laude in 1935.  Even though he intended to return to China after his graduation, he was unable to do so due to the chaos of World War II.  Instead, he entered the University of California, Berkeley, as a graduate student, where he earned a Ph.D. in Chinese literature in 1949 with a dissertation entitled, "The Doctrine of Non-Duality in the Vimalakīrtinirdeśa Sūtra."

Once he received his Ph.D. in 1949, Richard B. Mather was hired as a professor at the University of Minnesota, where he founded the Chinese program and developed its courses. Professor Mather taught full-time at the University of Minnesota until he was forced to retire in 1984 because of a university policy that required professors to retire at age 70.  However, because of his specialized wealth of knowledge in classical Chinese, especially in the Chinese Six Dynasties period (220-589), he was allowed to teach part-time for several years after that and do directed studies for advanced students in Chinese.

After he completely retired from university teaching In the late 1990s, Professor Mather and another retired Chinese Professor at the University of Minnesota, Chun-jo Liu, teamed up to form a private Chinese reading and translating group.  The group was composed of Chinese professors and other highly educated individuals who had an advanced knowledge of Chinese, especially classical Chinese.  The group would generally meet once or twice a week to read Chinese literature and poetry and then translate it into English.  The group also participated in Chinese language conferences at which their panel members would read papers on their particular areas of interest and research.

In early 2009, the group switched its focus from reading and translating Chinese to working on getting Professor Mather's biography of his father, William Arnot Mather, and his own autobiography published as a single-volume memoir.  The group that worked on it consisted of Professor Mather and his wife, Virginia Mather; Professor Chun-jo Liu as the project coordinator; classical Chinese specialist James M. Kindler as the editor, typist, and author of the Afterword; Gary August as the official artist, who painted two separate paintings for the book (one of Professor and Mrs. Mather standing by two Chinese scrolls, and one of the Great Wall of China); Professor P. Richard Bohr as the author of the foreword; Daniel H. Donnelly as the copyright specialist; Professor Alan L. Kagan as the group treasurer; Mae A. Kindler as the technical consultant; James H. Nebel as the multimedia talk show host, who interviewed Professor and Mrs. Mather, Professor Chun-jo Liu, and James Kindler for a television special; and Wang Nai-chen as a major financial contributor.  By October 2010, the Mather family memoir was completed by the group and published by Edwin Mellen Press in Lewiston, New York.  On December 3, 2010, the Chinese reading and translating group then hosted a private, by-invitation-only memoir party for Professor and Mrs. Mather to honor them for their success in getting Professor Mather's family memoir published.

The short biography of Richard B. Mather from that family memoir, "William Arnot Mather, American Missionary to China and Richard Burroughs Mather, Professor of Chinese: The Biography and Autobiography of a Father and a Son," is as follows: "Richard B. Mather, an ordained Presbyterian minister and a professor emeritus of Chinese language and literature at the University of Minnesota-Twin Cities, is a world-renowned specialist of the Chinese Six Dynasties period (220-589).  As the author of several noteworthy books, he is especially well-known for his monumental English translation of the Chinese classic, "Shih-shuo Hsin-yü," by Liu I-ch'ing (403-444).  He and Virginia, his wife of 71 years, reside in Falcon Heights, Minnesota."

A festschrift in honor of Richard B. Mather was published by the T'ang Studies Society in Provo, Utah, in 2003.  Its title is "Studies in Early Medieval Chinese Literature and Cultural History: In Honor of Richard B. Mather & Donald Holzman."  This special festschrift was edited by Paul W. Kroll & David R Knechtges, both of whom are professors of Chinese, and it includes contributions by ten Chinese specialists.  The section specifically about Professor Mather is found on pages (xii)-xxiii: a color photo of Professor Mather is on page (xii), his biography is on pages xiii-xviii, and his bibliography is on pages xix-xxiii.

The Princeton Alumni Weekly (July 15, 2009 - Volume 109, Number 16) featured a short article by Stephen Dittmann about Richard B. Mather that mentions Professor Mather's final book ("William Arnot Mather, American Missionary to China and Richard Burroughs Mather, Professor of Chinese") and provides several paragraphs of biographical information on Professor Mather.  Professor Mather was a Princeton graduate of 1935.  A memorial to Richard B. Mather was also published in the Princeton Alumni Weekly (December 2, 2015 - Volume 116, Number 5) that provides a black & white graduation picture and a brief biography.

Richard B. Mather is best known for his monumental translation of the early medieval Chinese prose collection, "Shih-shuo Hsin-yü: A New Account of Tales of the World" (published title in Wade–Giles); "Shìshuō xīnyǔ" (title in modern Pinyin); 世說新語 (title in Chinese characters).

Selected works
 Mather, Richard B., The Chinese-American Song and Game Book.  New York: A.S. Barnes and Company, 1944.
 Mather, Richard B., The Doctrine of Non-Duality in the Vimalakīrtinirdeśa Sūtra.  Ph.D. dissertation. Berkeley, California: University of California, Berkeley, 1949.
 Mather, Richard B., 1913-2014 (author/translator). Biography of Lü Kuang: [Annotated translation of Chin shu 122]. Berkeley, California: University of California Press, 1959.
  2nd edition (2002), University of Michigan, Center for Chinese Studies. 
 
 
 Mather, Richard B., 1913-2014 (author); Kindler, James M. (editor); August, Gary (artist); Bohr, P. Richard (Foreword author); Kindler, James M. (Afterword author). William Arnot Mather, American Missionary to China and Richard Burroughs Mather, Professor of Chinese: The Biography and Autobiography of a Father and a Son. Lewiston, New York: Edwin Mellen Press, 2010. One volume, 61 numbered pages; Illustrated with numerous black & white photographs, including the family portrait on the front cover; Index, pages 53–61. 8vo: original grey boards with black and red printing.  .

References
Footnotes

Works cited
University of Minnesota, Department of Asian Languages and Literature Blog, Professor Richard B. Mather Turns 100 Today!

1913 births
2014 deaths
People from Falcon Heights, Minnesota
American sinologists
American centenarians
Men centenarians
American expatriates in China